Long Branch is a  long 1st order tributary to Elkin Creek in Wilkes County, North Carolina.

Course
Long Branch rises in Benham, North Carolina and then flows southeasterly to join Elkin Creek at about 0.5 miles north of Pleasant Hill, North Carolina.

Watershed
Long Branch drains  of area, receives about 50.0 in/year of precipitation, has a wetness index of 348.51, and is about 42% forested.

References

Rivers of North Carolina
Bodies of water of Wilkes County, North Carolina